Sioux Falls School District is a public school district located in Sioux Falls, South Dakota, United States. Sioux Falls School District serves nearly 24,000 students.
The district has 23 elementary schools, 6 middle schools and 4 high schools.

Schools

Secondary schools
Axtell Park Building
Lincoln High School
Roosevelt High School
Washington High School
Jefferson High School

Middle schools 
Axtell Park Building
Ben Reifel Middle School
Edison Middle School
George McGovern Middle School
Memorial Middle School
Patrick Henry Middle School
Whittier Middle School

Elementary schools

All-City
Anne Sullivan
Challenge Center
Cleveland
Discovery
Eugene Field A+
Garfield
Harvey Dunn
Hayward
Hawthorne 
Horace Mann
John F. Kennedy (JFK)
John Harris
Laura B. Anderson
Laura Wilder
Lowell
Oscar Howe
Renberg
Robert Frost
R.F. Pettigrew
Rosa Parks
Sonia Sotomayor
Susan B. Anthony
Terry Redlin

References

School districts in South Dakota
Education in Sioux Falls, South Dakota